Brachyglottis traversii is a naturally uncommon endemic plant in New Zealand.

References

traversii
Endemic flora of New Zealand